Keenan Alexander Allen (born April 27, 1992) is an American football wide receiver for the Los Angeles Chargers of the National Football League (NFL). He played college football at California before leaving after his junior year. He was drafted by the Chargers in the third round of the 2013 NFL Draft. Allen won multiple rookie honors after setting Chargers' records for receptions  and receiving yards by a rookie. In 2017, he was named the NFL Comeback Player of the Year.

Early years
Allen attended Grimsley Senior High School and then Northern Guilford High School in Greensboro, North Carolina, where he played football, basketball, and ran track. In football, he was a standout on both sides of the ball for the Nighthawks football team. He was a 2009 high school All-American, selected by USA Today and Parade, and also played in U.S. Army All-American Bowl, returning one punt for 33 yards as well as one kickoff also for 33 yards.

In track & field, Allen was a state qualifier in the long jump (top-jump of 7.01 meters). As a senior, he competed in sprints. He took 24th in the 400-meter dash event at the 2010 PTFCA State Meet, with a time of 51.60 seconds. He also competed in the 100-meter dash, recording a personal-best time of 11.2 seconds. In addition, he was also timed at 4.56 seconds in the 40-yard dash.

Allen was regarded as a five-star recruit by Rivals.com and Scout.com, and was widely considered the top defensive back in the nation. Allen initially committed to the University of Alabama to play safety, but switched his commitment to the University of California, Berkeley in order to play wide receiver and play with his half brother, Zach Maynard.

College career

Allen attended the University of California, Berkeley, where he started at wide receiver for the California Golden Bears football team from 2010 to 2012.  As a freshman in the 2010 season, he had 46 receptions for 490 yards and five touchdowns. As a sophomore in the 2011 season, Allen had a career-high 98 catches for 1,343 yards. As a junior in the 2012 season, he had 61 receptions for 737 yards and six touchdowns. He left Cal after his junior season having caught a school-record 205 passes, for 2,570 yards (third in school history) and 25 touchdowns (seventh).

Collegiate statistics

Professional career

Due to a posterior cruciate ligament (PCL) sprain he sustained during the 2012 season, Allen did not work out at the NFL Scouting Combine, but did run routes at Cal's Pro Day. Keenan Allen was described by draft pundits as one of the best receivers in the 2013 NFL draft, estimating that he would be picked in the latter half of the first round.

On April 9, 2013, Allen attended his own pro day, where he showed his route-running skills and catching abilities to numerous scouts and reporters. Due to the aforementioned PCL sprain, he was not at peak performance, leading to a 4.71-second time in the 40-yard dash. Allen noted that he was only at 80% health on the pro day. This led to a drop in his projected draft position.

Allen was drafted in the third round, 76th overall, by the San Diego Chargers in the 2013 NFL Draft, though the team already had solid depth at the wide receiver position. He was the highest selected wide receiver from Cal since DeSean Jackson in 2008. Allen had been on General Manager Tom Telesco's radar for a while. In 2011, Telesco attended Cal’s game against USC at San Francisco’s AT&T Park where Allen enjoyed one of the most prolific days of his career that evening, catching a career-best 13 passes for 160 yards.

2013 season

On May 9, 2013, Allen signed a four-year, $2.81 million contract with the Chargers, which included a $613,800 signing bonus.

Allen struggled at times during training camp. Teammate and veteran tight end Antonio Gates envisioned that Allen in 2013 would play behind Eddie Royal, Vincent Brown, Malcom Floyd, and Danario Alexander. Although Alexander suffered a season-ending injury in the preseason, Allen did not participate in any offensive plays in San Diego's season opening loss to the Houston Texans. Unaccustomed to being a reserve player, he considered quitting football and returning to school to complete his degree.  He began receiving playing time the following week against the Philadelphia Eagles when Floyd suffered a season-ending injury. On October 6, 2013, against the Oakland Raiders, Allen had his first 100-yard game as an NFL receiver, having six catches for 115 yards and a touchdown. The next week, in a win against the Indianapolis Colts on Monday Night Football, Allen recorded nine catches for 107 yards and a touchdown. In Week 14, he broke the franchise record for receptions in a rookie season, surpassing LaDainian Tomlinson, with 61 with three weeks remaining in the regular season.

Allen finished the season leading all NFL rookies with 71 receptions, and led the team with 1,046 receiving yards—which also broke the Chargers rookie record of 1,001 set by John Jefferson in 1978. Only five other rookies had ever had more receiving yards in league history, while his eight touchdowns tied him for third all-time with six other rookies. He also set a Chargers rookie record with five 100-yard games in a season,  and he tied Royal for the team lead in touchdowns. Four times during the season Allen was voted the NFL Rookie of the Week, and he was named NFL Rookie of the Year by Sporting News over runner-up Eddie Lacy. While the Pro Football Writers Association (PFWA) named running back Lacy their 2013 Rookie of the Year, they also named Allen their Offensive Rookie of the Year. Allen was runner-up to Lacy for the Offensive Rookie of the Year by the Associated Press (AP), considered by the NFL to be its official award. In a vote by fans, Allen was named Pepsi NEXT NFL Rookie of the Year. Many experts came to view Allen's being drafted in the third round as a steal by San Diego; seven other wide receivers were taken before him. ESPN wrote in December that "Allen has performed like a first-round talent." The Chargers qualified for the playoffs that season. In the Wild Card Round, they defeated the Cincinnati Bengals by a score of 27–10. They advanced to the Divisional Round, when Allen caught two touchdowns during a comeback attempt in the fourth quarter of a 24–17 loss to the Denver Broncos. He finished with six receptions for 142 yards, becoming just the second rookie in NFL history to gain 100 receiving yards and score two touchdowns in a playoff game.

2014 season
In Week 4 of the 2014 season, Allen established a career-high of 10 receptions for 135 yards in a 33–14 win over the Jacksonville Jaguars. During Week 12 against the Baltimore Ravens, he recorded two touchdowns and 121 receiving yards contributing to the Chargers win. He missed the last two games of the season after suffering a broken right collarbone against the Denver Broncos in Week 15. He finished the season with 77 receptions for 783 yards and four touchdowns.

2015 season
In the season-opening 33–28 victory over the Detroit Lions,  Allen had 15 receptions for 166 yards, tying Kellen Winslow's franchise record for most receptions in a game. The next week, Allen struggled all game to get open, finishing with two receptions for 16 yards. However, the following week Allen caught both of the Chargers touchdowns and had 12 receptions for 133 yards in a losing attempt against the Minnesota Vikings. Against the Cleveland Browns, Allen had four receptions for 72 yards and a diving touchdown grab.

On November 3, the Chargers announced that Allen would miss the rest of the season after suffering a kidney injury. Overall, he finished the 2015 season with 67 receptions for 725 receiving yards and four touchdowns.

2016 season
On June 10, 2016, Allen agreed to a four-year, $45 million contract extension with the Chargers. In the 2016 season opener against the Kansas City Chiefs, Allen was down on the field in pain with less than two minutes to go in the first half, and was carted off the field. He was diagnosed with an anterior cruciate ligament (ACL) tear and missed the rest of the season.

2017 season
On September 11, 2017, in the season opener against the Denver Broncos on Monday Night Football, Allen returned from his injury and had five receptions for 35 yards and a touchdown in the 24–21 loss. In Week 2, against the Miami Dolphins, Allen had nine receptions for 100 yards for his 13th career game with at least 100 yards and the first such since Week 6 of the 2015 season. In Week 11, in a 54–24 victory over the Buffalo Bills, he had 12 receptions for 159 receiving yards and two touchdowns. On Thanksgiving Day, during Week 12 against the Dallas Cowboys, Allen finished with 172 receiving yards and a touchdown as the Chargers won 28–6. In Week 13, Allen became the first player in NFL history to record three consecutive games of 10+ catches, 100+ receiving yards, and at least one touchdown. On December 19, 2017, Allen was named to his first Pro Bowl. Allen finished the season, his first where he played 16 regular season games, with 102 receptions for 1,393 yards and six touchdowns. His 102 receptions finished fourth in the league. He passed LaDainian Tomlinson (100) for the most in a season in Chargers history. His 1,393 receiving yards finished third in the league behind Antonio Brown and Julio Jones and were second most in a season in Chargers history behind Lance Alworth. He was named the NFL Comeback Player of the Year after an impressive 2017 season coming back from a torn ACL in 2016. He was ranked 41st by his peers on the NFL Top 100 Players of 2018.

2018 season
Allen started off the season off with eight receptions for 108 yards and a touchdown against the Kansas City Chiefs. On November 4, against the Seattle Seahawks, he had six receptions for 124 yards. Following the Seahawks game, he went on a stretch of five consecutive games with a receiving touchdown. His best game in that stretch was a 14-catch, 148-yard game against the Pittsburgh Steelers. Overall, he finished the 2018 season with 97 receptions for 1,196 receiving yards and six receiving touchdowns. In the Wild Card Round, he had four receptions for 37 yards in the 23–17 win over the Baltimore Ravens. In the Divisional Round loss to the New England Patriots, he had two receptions for 75 yards and a touchdown. He earned a second Pro Bowl nomination. He was ranked 38th by his fellow players on the NFL Top 100 Players of 2019.

2019 season

In the season-opener against the Indianapolis Colts, Allen caught eight passes for 123 yards and his first touchdown of the season in the 30–24 overtime win. Two weeks later against the Houston Texans, Allen caught 13 passes for 183 yards and two touchdowns as the Chargers lost 27–20. He finished the season with a franchise record 104 catches for 1,199 yards and six touchdowns. He earned a Pro Bowl nomination for the third consecutive season. He was ranked 77th by his fellow players on the NFL Top 100 Players of 2020.

2020 season
On September 5, 2020, Allen signed a four-year, $80.1 million contract extension with the Chargers. In Week 3, he recorded 13 receptions for 132 receiving yards and one touchdown in the 21–16 loss to the Carolina Panthers. In Week 7 against the Jacksonville Jaguars, he had ten receptions for 125 yards in the 39–29 victory. In Week 9 against the Las Vegas Raiders, Allen recorded 9 catches for 103 yards and a touchdown during the 31–26 loss. In Week 11 against the New York Jets, Allen recorded 16 catches for 145 yards and a touchdown during the 34–28 win. He was placed on the reserve/COVID-19 list by the Chargers on December 31, 2020, and activated on January 7, 2021. He earned a Pro Bowl nomination for the fourth consecutive season. He was ranked 55th by his fellow players on the NFL Top 100 Players of 2021.

2021 season
In the 2021 season, Allen finished with 106 receptions for 1,128 receiving yards and six receiving touchdowns. He had four games with at least 100 receiving yards. He earned a Pro Bowl nomination for the fifth consecutive season. He was ranked 35th by his fellow players on the NFL Top 100 Players of 2022.

NFL career statistics

Personal life
Allen is Lumbee and is the younger half-brother of quarterback Zach Maynard, who also played at Cal. The two combined for the longest pass play in school history when they hooked up on a 90-yard score against the Washington Huskies. They share a mother, Dorie Maynard-Lang, and Maynard's biological father, Scott Lang, is Allen's stepfather. Allen's cousin, Maurice Harris, is a former NFL wide receiver, with the two being teammates in high school and college.

Allen is childhood friend of former cornerback David Amerson, who was selected in the 2013 NFL Draft by the Washington Redskins.

Notes

References

External links

 Los Angeles Chargers bio
 California Golden Bears bio

1992 births
Living people
African-American players of American football
American football wide receivers
American football return specialists
Players of American football from Greensboro, North Carolina
California Golden Bears football players
San Diego Chargers players
Los Angeles Chargers players
American Conference Pro Bowl players
21st-century African-American sportspeople
Ed Block Courage Award recipients